Lena Metlege Diab (born 1965) is a Canadian politician, who was elected to the Nova Scotia House of Assembly in the 2013 provincial election. A member of the Nova Scotia Liberal Party, she represented the electoral district of Halifax Armdale until 2021.

She did not run for another term in the provincial legislature in the 2021 Nova Scotia general election, opting instead to run as the Liberal Party of Canada candidate for the riding of Halifax West in the 2021 Canadian federal election.

Early life and career
Diab was born in Halifax, the daughter of first-generation Lebanese immigrants. She moved to Lebanon at age 2 but then moved back to Halifax at age 11, escaping the Lebanese Civil War.

Diab graduated from Saint Mary's University in 1985 with a Bachelor of Arts in economics and political science. She worked as a page at the Nova Scotia Legislature during this time.

She then attended  Dalhousie University where she obtained her Master of Public Administration in 1987 and Bachelor of Laws in 1990. Diab practiced law and operated a small business in Halifax. She is the mother of four children who are active in local sports and community organizations in Nova Scotia.

Diab is a noted community leader and volunteer. She is the recipient of the "Outstanding Professional of the Year" award (2010) from the Canadian Lebanese Chamber of Commerce and Industry. She has received the "Mainland North Champion Award" (2010). Diab was a recipient of the Queen Elizabeth II Diamond Jubilee Medal (2013). She received the "Nova Scotia Provincial Volunteer Award" (2013). She has served many years as the President of the Canadian Lebanon Society of Halifax, and oversaw the celebration of the 75th Anniversary celebrations held throughout Halifax in 2013.

Political career
Diab sought and was elected in the riding of Halifax Armdale in the 2013 Nova Scotia general election for the Nova Scotia Liberal Party.  On October 22, 2013, Diab was appointed to the Executive Council of Nova Scotia as Minister of Justice, as well as Attorney General, Minister of Immigration and various other cabinet responsibilities. She was the first female to hold the position of Attorney General in Nova Scotia, as well as the first Lebanese Canadian to hold a cabinet position in Nova Scotia.

On July 24, 2015, premier Stephen McNeil shuffled his cabinet with Diab being retained as Minister of Immigration, but being shuffled out as Minister of Justice.

On June 15, 2017, premier Stephen McNeil shuffled his cabinet, retaining Diab as Minister of Immigration, but giving her an additional role in cabinet as Minister of Acadian Affairs and Francophonie.

On October 13, 2020, premier Stephen McNeil shuffled his cabinet in response to the resignation of three Ministers who entered the leadership race to replace him. Diab was given an additional role in cabinet as Minister of Labour and Advanced Education.

On February 23, 2021, premier Iain Rankin was sworn in as Nova Scotia's 29th premier along with a new cabinet. Diab retained her roles as Minister of Labour and Advanced Education and Minister of Acadian Affairs and Francophonie, while also retaining the newly renamed role of Minister of Immigration and Population Growth.

Electoral record

|-

|Liberal
|Lena Diab
|align="right"| 3,208
|align="right"| 49.34
|align="right"|
|-

|New Democratic Party
|Drew Moore
|align="right"| 2,233
|align="right"| 34.34
|align="right"| 
|-

|Progressive Conservative
|Irvine Carvery
|align="right"| 1,061
|align="right"| 16.32
|align="right"|
|}

Personal life
In January 2017, Diab's husband Maroun was charged with assault, uttering threats and choking his wife, as well as threatening two other people in relation to an incident that occurred at their home in Halifax on December 31, 2016. On March 23, 2017, her husband was found not criminally responsible for the incident after an assessment at the East Coast Forensic Hospital.

References

External links

Living people
Nova Scotia Liberal Party MLAs
People from Halifax, Nova Scotia
Women MLAs in Nova Scotia
Lawyers in Nova Scotia
Members of the Executive Council of Nova Scotia
Women government ministers of Canada
Schulich School of Law alumni
Saint Mary's University (Halifax) alumni
Attorneys General of Nova Scotia
Canadian politicians of Lebanese descent
21st-century Canadian women politicians
1965 births
Members of the House of Commons of Canada from Nova Scotia
Women members of the House of Commons of Canada
Liberal Party of Canada MPs